The 1950–51 Boston Celtics season was the fifth season of the Boston Celtics in the National Basketball Association (NBA). It was Red Auerbach's first season as head coach. This was the first winning season in franchise history, finishing 9 games above .500, beginning a streak of 19 consecutive winning seasons. They also qualified for the playoffs for the second time in franchise history, starting a streak of 19 consecutive postseason appearances.

Draft picks

Roster

Pre-season

Regular season

Season standings

Record vs. opponents

Game log

Playoffs

|- align="center" bgcolor="#ffcccc"
| 1
| March 20
| New York
| L 69–83
| Ed Macauley (23)
| —
| Boston Garden
| 0–1
|- align="center" bgcolor="#ffcccc"
| 2
| March 22
| @ New York
| L 78–92
| Ed Macauley (21)
| Bob Cousy (6)
| Madison Square Garden III
| 0–2
|-

Player statistics

Season

Playoffs

Awards and records
 Ed Macauley, All-NBA First Team

Transactions

References

See also
 1950–51 NBA season

Boston Celtics seasons
Boston Celtics
Boston Celtics
Boston Celtics
1950s in Boston